Widodo may refer to:

Surname
Joko Widodo (born 1961), President of Indonesia (2014-), Governor of Jakarta (2012-2014), Mayor of Surakarta (2005–2012)
Raden Widodo (1924-1993), General in Indonesia
Rudi Widodo (born 1983), Indonesian football player

Given name
Widodo Adi Sutjipto (born 1944), Indonesian admiral
Widodo Cahyono Putro (born 1970), Indonesian football player